Moorina is a rural locality in the Moreton Bay Region, Queensland, Australia.

Geography
Part of the western boundary of Moorina follows Gregors Creek.

The proposed Bruce Highway Western Alternative will pass through Moorina from south to north.

History 
The locality name was originally a property name owned by J. W. Carseldine. The name is thought to be from Tasmania.

Moorina State School opened on 1918 and closed on 1954. The school was on Moorina Road.

The median age of the Moorina population was 45 years, 8 years above the national median of 37.  80.3% of people living in Moorina were born in Australia. The other top responses for country of birth were England 6.2%, New Zealand 2.8%, Scotland 1.1%, Papua New Guinea 1.1%, Italy 0.8%.  92.1% of people spoke only English at home; the next most common languages were 1.1% Greek, and 0.8% Italian.

References

Suburbs of Moreton Bay Region
Localities in Queensland